Sandra D. Tooley is a mystery and urban fantasy novelist who publishes as S. D. Tooley and Lee Driver. Her books have won a number of awards.

Biography
The author was raised in a suburb south of Chicago, Illinois, and she currently resides in Northwest Indiana.  She cites Nancy Drew, Stephen King, and James Patterson as her primary influences.

As S.D. Tooley, she writes the Sam Casey Mystery series which is set in a suburb south of Chicago.  The series features Samantha Casey, a Detective Sergeant with the ability to speak with the dead.  She has also published The Skull, the first installment in the Remy and Roadkill Mystery series for ages 12 to 112, under this name.

As Lee Driver, she writes the Chase Dagger Mystery series which is set in a fictional suburb of Northwest Indiana.  The series features a private detective "who seems to inherit the most unusual cases."  Dagger's assistant, Sara Morningsky, is a young Native American woman who has the ability to transform into a hawk or wolf.  His pet, a scarlet macaw named Einstein, has a photographic memory.

Besides print editions, all of her titles are available in audio book from Books in Motion and as eBook downloads in all formats from Smashwords.com.  Four of her titles are also in large print from Ulverscroft.

Novels

Sam Casey Mysteries
When the Dead Speak (1999)
Nothing Else Matters (2000)
Restless Spirit (2002)
Echoes from the Grave (2007)
What Lies Within (2010)

Remy and Roadkill Mystery
The Skull (2006)

Chase Dagger Mystery
The Good Die Twice (1999)
Full Moon, Bloody Moon (2000)
The Unseen (2004)
Chasing Ghosts (2008)

Awards 
The Skull, her mystery for middle school audiences, was awarded the Ida Chittum Award for best mystery.
Nothing Else Matters won ForeWord Magazine's Book of the Year Award in 2000.
Restless Spirit won ForeWord Magazine's Book of the Year Award in 2002.

References

External links
Author's official website
Fantastic Fiction

Living people
20th-century American novelists
21st-century American novelists
American mystery writers
American fantasy writers
American women novelists
Novelists from Illinois
Novelists from Indiana
Pseudonymous women writers
Women science fiction and fantasy writers
Women mystery writers
20th-century American women writers
21st-century American women writers
20th-century pseudonymous writers
21st-century pseudonymous writers
Year of birth missing (living people)